"Reason to Believe" is a song by American singer Lionel Richie. It was written by Richie along with Dallas Austin and Tony Reyes for Richie's eighth studio album Coming Home (2006), while production was helmed by Austin. The song was released as the album's fourth single in 2007 and reached number 76 on the German Albums Chart.

Track listing

Charts

References

2004 singles
Lionel Richie songs
Song recordings produced by Dallas Austin
Songs written by Dallas Austin
Songs written by Lionel Richie
2006 songs
Songs written by Tony Reyes